Beckenham is a town in Greater London, England, within the London Borough of Bromley. Until 1965 it was part of the historic county of Kent. Its population at the 2011 census counted 46,844 inhabitants.

Beckenham was, until the coming of the railway in 1857, a small village, with most of its land being rural and private parkland. John Barwell Cator and his family began the leasing and selling of land for the building of villas which led to a rapid increase in population, between 1850 and 1900, from 2,000 to 26,000. Housing and population growth has continued at a lesser pace since 1900.

The town, directly west of Bromley, has areas of commerce and industry, principally around the curved network of streets featuring its high street and is served in transport by three main railway stations — nine within the post town — plus towards its western periphery two Tramlink stations. In common with the rest of Bromley, the largest borough of London by area, Beckenham has several pockets of recreational land which are a mixture of sports grounds, fishing ponds and parks.

Etymology
The place-name 'Beckenham' is first attested in a Saxon charter of 862 as Biohhahema mearc.
The settlement is referred to as Bacheham in the Domesday Book of 1086, and in the Textus Roffensis as Becceham. The name is thought to derive from Beohha'''s homestead (Beohha + ham in Old English). The name of the small stream here – the River Beck – is most likely to have been named after the village.

History

Although early written history tells little of the area we have the entry in the Domesday Book of 1086 and various records in Court Rolls, Feet of Fines and other historical documents. Thomas Philipott recorded it in his Villare Cantianum in 1659 based on the research of his father John Philipott. Hasted wrote about it in 1778 in his History and Topography of Kent based on Philipott's material. Others like Lysons and Ireland continued to record Beckenham Manor, Foxgrove Manor, Kelsey and Langley estates and Kent House Farm. Several other local historians updated the account based on more recent events and developments of Beckenham. Revisiting the history and collating the historical documentary evidence has revealed a more detailed early history showing how the manors and estates changed hands through families such as Rokele, Bruyn, Bardolf, Langley, Style, Kelshulle, Brograve, Raymond, Leigh, Burrell, Cator and various yeoman property owners like Kempsall, King, Batt  etc. Archaeological evidence at nearby Holwood Park, where Stone Age and Bronze Age artefacts have been found, reveals some evidence of early settlers. A Roman camp was sited here, and a Roman road, the London to Lewes Way passed through the district.

By the time of the arrival of the Normans, the manor of Beckenham encompased much of what is modern Beckenham, with other areas covered by the estates of Foxgrove Manor, Kelsey and Langley. Although William the Conqueror's half brother, Biship Odo, was overlord of all of Kent the manor of Beckenham was held or enfeoffed to Anschil of Rochester.  The manor became divided but eventually rejoined under the St. John family until Frederick St. John, 3rd Viscount Bolingbroke sold most of the manor to John Cator the younger in 1773. The manor house  and its grounds had been exchanged with Peter Burrell, Lord Gwydir in 1757. Beckenham remained a small village until well into the 19th century. The beginning of its growth began after 1825 when the estates of John Barwell Cator and Lord Gwydir began to be developed. if  In 1760 John Cator the younger built Beckenham Place and became lord of the manor in 1773 after purchasing the manor of Beckenham from Frederick St. John, Viscount Bolingbroke. After Cator died in 1806, his heirs under his nephew John Barwell Cator became aware that an area in such relative close proximity to London was ripe for development, especially once the railway had arrived in 1857, and large villas began to be built around the new station. Wide roads and large gardens epitomised these properties, often built by developers who acquired land from the Cators. Lord Gwydir died in 1820 and his estates were split up, sold and developed. The manor of Foxgrove was owned by the Leigh family for some generations but purchased into the ownership of Lancelot Tolson circa 1716, his heirs divided it and it was acquired in part by John Cator and Jones Raymond. Raymond's part passed on to the Burrells and a land exchange in 1793 made the northern parts of the manor John Cator's and the southern parts absorbed into the Burrells Langley and Kelsey estates. What is now Beckenham Place Park is almost entirely parts of Foxgrove manor. Now it is part of the London Borough of Lewisham after boundary changes in the 1990's.

The Kelsey Estate, named from a manorial estate, Kelsies, recorded in 1479. The estate was granted to William Kelshulle in 1408. Peter Burrell the first bought Kelsey in 1688 and a house which had belonged to John Brograve was on the site. In the mid 18th Century a mansion was built overlooking the lake in Kelsey Park. This was later rebuilt, extended or altered circa 1835 to replace an earlier structure, though it was itself demolished in 1921 and the grounds turned into Kelsey Park. The only surviving buildings are the two Grade II listed lodge cottages at the entrance, which are over 200 years old.

In 1876 Beckenham Cemetery opened (originally Crystal Palace District Cemetery), located south of the town in Elmers End.

Modern Beckenham

Today Beckenham is an outer London suburb, though it has maintained its own identity and forms a town in its own right. It is centred on its non-pedestrianised curving high street. Further rows of shops run east from the town centre along Bromley Road, south along Croydon Road, and west along Beckenham Road around Clock House station, where the town's library can be found. To the north lies the New Beckenham area, essentially a residential suburb of Beckenham proper.

Governance

The Municipal Borough of Beckenham came into being in 1935. It took over from what had been, since 1894, Beckenham Urban District Council and included parts of Hayes and West Wickham, previously part of Bromley Rural District Council. The new Borough status reflected the growth of Beckenham in less than fifty years.

Prior to 1965, Beckenham was part of the administrative county of Kent. In 1965, as part of the creation of the Greater London Council, the Borough council was disbanded and Beckenham came under control of the newly constituted London Borough of Bromley. Councillors represent various parts of the Borough of Beckenham. Beckenham Town Centre Management coordinates business interests in the town.

Geography

The original village of Beckenham was a cluster of development surrounded by the lands of a series of manorial estates: Beckenham, Foxgrove, Kelsey, Langley and Kent House Farm with their mansions, halls and Parks.
The parish boundary has changed over time but extended from Crystal Palace Park to Bromley and Lewisham to West Wickham.

The River Ravensbourne flows northwards at the eastern side of the town, towards its confluence with the River Thames forming an eastern boundary with Bromley. A small stream, the River Beck (sometimes referred to as the Hawkesbrook), passes through the town before joining the Ravensbourne via the Pool River further north near Catfod. 

The area is part of an outcrop of London Clay which were the basis for several brickworks during the development period with areas of Harwich Formation and consists of many small hills. Several gravel pits extracted parts of the Blackheath Beds which are now included in the Harwich Formation 

Economy

Beckenham is the headquarters to Capita Registrars Limited who provide share registration services for more than half of the UK's quoted companies. Proper Records, the UK's biggest independent music distributor, was originally based in Beckenham but relocated to Surrey Quays in 2017.

Transport
Rail
Beckenham town centre is served by Beckenham Junction station, with further stations (Clock House, New Beckenham, Ravensbourne, Beckenham Hill and Kent House) serving the surrounding area.

Beckenham Junction and Kent House have services into central London every 15 minutes, taking 13 minutes to Brixton and 21 minutes to London Victoria.

Beckenham Junction also provides services into London Bridge every 30 minutes, taking 35 minutes, and to Orpington every 15 minutes, taking 7 minutes to Bromley South and 17 minutes to Orpington.

Ravensbourne and Beckenham Hill stations provide direct access to central London and the City every 30 minutes - Peckham Rye in 12 minutes, Elephant & Castle in 23 minutes, London Blackfriars in 27 minutes, City Thameslink in 29 minutes, Farringdon in 33 minutes and London St Pancras in 37 minutes.

New Beckenham and Clock House have services to London Charing Cross, London Bridge, Waterloo East, London Cannon Street and Hayes.

Tram
Tramlink serves Beckenham with services from Beckenham Junction and Beckenham Road to Wimbledon via East Croydon.

Buses
Beckenham is served by several Transport for London buses that link the town with other areas including Bromley, Catford, Chislehurst, Croydon, Crystal Palace, Eltham, Lewisham, Orpington, Penge, West Wickham and Woolwich.

Religious sites

The town has a number of places of worship. St. George's Church is the principal parish church, and is in the centre of Beckenham. It was extensively rebuilt, at the end of the 19th century, but an earlier building dates back to 1100. It has a 13th-century lych gate that is thought to be one of the oldest in England. The almshouses next to the church go back to 1694. There are also three other Anglican churches in the town: All Saints Church; Holy Trinity Church; and St James at Elmers End. In addition, there are Methodist and  Baptist churches; and the Roman Catholic church dedicated to St Edmund of Canterbury.

Town churches include:
St. George's Church (W. Gibbs Bartleet, 1885–1887),  St. Barnabas on Oakhill Road (A. Stenning & H. Hall, 1878 or 1884), Christ Church, Fairfield Road (Blashill & Hayward, 1876), St. Edmund's Catholic Church, Village Way (J. P’Hanlon Hughes, 1937), St. James, St. James’ Avenue (A.R. Stenning, 1879–1898), St. Michael and All Angels, Ravenscroft Road (W. H. Hobday & F. H. Maynard, 1955–1956), St. Paul, Brackley Road (Smith & Williams, 1872), Holy Trinity, Lennard Road (E.F. Clarke, 1878), Baptist Church, Elm Road (Appleton & E. W. Mountford, 1889), Congregational Church, Crescent Road (J. W. & R. F. Beaumont, 1887–8), Methodist Church (James Weir, 1887).

Close to the Cinema a Christian Science Reading Room existed close to the site occupied by the postal sorting site in the 1980s. The site is now occupied by Kingsway church at 18 Rectory Rd. While the postal office site is now occupied by Citygate Church.

Demography
Strictly defined to its historic parish area translated to today's modern wards of the United Kingdom, Beckenham covers four such wards, however as a post town it contains more than 82,000 people as at the 2011 census.

Culture and leisure

Like most towns of its size, Beckenham has several leisure organisations and societies. The local Odeon cinema has six screens and is a grade II listed building. The Beckenham Festival of Music and Dancing takes place every November. Beckenham Theatre puts on amateur productions. The Beckenham Concert Band  is a community wind band which has, over the last 35 years, raised thousands of pounds for local and national charities. It caters for amateur wind and brass musicians and performs locally during the winter months and across London and the South East during the summer.

The South East London Green Chain, a long-distance footpath, crosses through Beckenham. Both Cator Park and Beckenham Place Park form part of the Chain. There are other open spaces in the town, including Croydon Road Recreation Ground and Kelsey Park. There is also a walk starting in Cator Park, going down the High Street, through Kelsey Park, then Croydon Road Recreation Ground and back to Cator Park. Beckenham Green, in the town centre, hosts regular markets and activities throughout the year.

Education

The principal secondary schools in Beckenham are Harris Academy Beckenham (formerly Kelsey Park Sports College), Harris Academy Bromley (formerly Cator Park School), the two Langley Park schools, for boys and for girls, and Eden Park High School. There are also a large number of schools catering for primary education, including the independent Roman Catholic school, Bishop Challoner, St Mary's Catholic Primary School, Marian Vian Primary School, Balgowan Primary School, Worsley Bridge Primary School, Harris Primary Academy Beckenham (formerly Bromley Road Infants School), Clare House Primary School and Churchfields Primary School.

Health
Beckenham Hospital, now called Beckenham Beacon, following redevelopment in 2009, is a minor treatment centre and an outstation to Princess Royal Hospital in Farnborough for outpatient services. It has GP, dental and other services available.

Sport

Beckenham has a non-League football club Beckenham Town F.C., which plays at Eden Park Avenue, and a Sunday league team, Beckenham Manor Football Club, which plays at Langley Sports Club.

Beckenham Cricket Club plays at Foxgrove Road, a former first-class cricket ground. It has been the breeding ground of England internationals Derek Underwood and Richard Ellison, and most recently Kent County captain Robert Key.

From 1886 to 1996, the club also staged the Kent Championships, an international tennis tournament, which featured many of the world's top players because it opened the grass-court season building up to The Championships at Wimbledon. In June 1968, the club held the world's first "open" grass-court tournament - one month after the sport became open to amateur and professional players - with Australians Fred Stolle and Margaret Court winning the singles titles. Beckenham Cricket Club is also the home to Bromley and Beckenham Hockey Club.

Beckenham Rugby Football Club is a rugby union club formed originally in 1894. It fields six senior men's teams a successful women's team, and also has one of the largest youth sections in the South East.

Beccehamians RFC, a rugby union club founded in 1933, plays competitive rugby at Sparrows Den, at the bottom of Corkscrew Hill near West Wickham.

Swimmers from Beckenham Swimming Club, established in 1893, have gained medals in the 21st century at national and international levels.

The training ground for Premier League club Crystal Palace is located on Copers Cope Road.

Media
In Simon Brett's long-running BBC Radio 4 comedy drama, No Commitments (1992–2007), Beckenham is the home of the wildly snobbish, socially aspirational and insecure sister Victoria; the town is frequently mocked by association.
Beckenham is also one of the main locations of the novel The Buddha of Suburbia'' (1990), by Hanif Kureishi.

Notable people

 
Numerous prominent personages were born or have lived in Beckenham. In the world of politics and governance, these include the colonial administrator George Eden, 1st Earl of Auckland (1784–1849), politician and diplomat William Eden, 1st Baron Auckland (1745–1814), Admiral of the Royal Navy Sir Peircy Brett (1709–1781), CSgt Frank Bourne of Rorke's Drift (who lived at 16 King's Hall Road, Beckenham and is buried in Beckenham Cemetery), eminent judge Wilfred Greene, 1st Baron Greene (1883–1952 – born at 8 Fox Grove Road) and Fr. Thomas Pelham Dale SSC, an Anglo-Catholic clergyman prosecuted for Ritualist practices in the 1870s. Former British Prime Minister John Major lived at West Oak in Beckenham with his wife Norma from 1974 to 1978.

Writers include Enid Blyton who lived at 95 Chaffinch Road from 1897 to 1903, Walter de la Mare, who lived at 195 Mackenzie Road, and A.L. Barker (1918–2002).

Show business people include Bob Monkhouse (1928–2003), Julie Andrews, who lived on Cromwell Road, Floella Benjamin (now Baroness Benjamin of Beckenham), who grew up on Mackenzie Road, Maurice Denham (1909–2002), Simon Ward (1941–2012). and Betty Box (1915–1999) and her brother Sydney (1907–1983), both film producers.

A noteworthy musician associated with the area was David Bowie (1947–2016), who lived at 42 Southend Road from 1969 to 1973. Others from the area include Rolling Stones bassist Bill Wyman, who went to school in Beckenham, Peter Frampton, who was born in Beckenham, the Dutch singer Wende Snijders; the pop/rock musician David Sylvian, who was born in the town but raised in nearby Catford, Status Quo keyboardist Andy Bown who was born in Beckenham, and musician Anne Dudley of the band Art of Noise who is from the town.

There are many sports personalities, especially cricketers, plus Tom Pettitt (1859–1956), real tennis world champion 1885–90. Boxer David Haye, WBA champion, moved to Beckenham in 2010.

Gallery

References

External links

Areas of London
Districts of the London Borough of Bromley
District centres of London
Former civil parishes in the London Borough of Bromley